Gold is a compilation album by the American funk band Ohio Players. It was released in October 1976 by Mercury Records and features music from the albums Skin Tight, Fire, Honey, and Contradiction, along with two new recordings—"Feel the Beat (Everybody Disco)" and "Only a Child Can Love". The compilation earned a gold certification from the RIAA and was the last Ohio Players album to do so. 
 
In March 2008, Mercury released a different two-disc, 24-track compilation album, also called Gold.

Critical reception 
Reviewing in Christgau's Record Guide: Rock Albums of the Seventies (1981), Robert Christgau wrote:

Track listing
 "Feel the Beat (Everybody Disco)" (3:15)
 "Love Rollercoaster" (2:52)
 "I Want to Be Free" (3:15)
 "Fopp" (3:45)
 "Far East Mississippi" (3:07)
 "Skin Tight" (2:50)
 "Fire" (4:36)
 "Sweet Sticky Thing" (3:25)
 "Jive Turkey (Part 1)" (3:05)
 "Only a Child Can Love" (4:12)
 "Who'd She Coo?" (3:18)

Charts

Singles

References

External links
 Gold at Discogs

Ohio Players albums
1976 greatest hits albums
Mercury Records compilation albums